The Barton River is a river in the Kimberley region of Western Australia.

The headwaters of the river rise on the edge of the Carson Escarpment where it meets the Barton plain  and flows in a westerly direction until it discharges into the Drysdale River, of which it is a tributary.

The traditional owners of the areas around the river are the Miwa people.

The river was named in 1901 by government surveyor Frederick Slade Drake-Brockman, after the first Prime Minister of Australia, Edmund Barton.

References

Rivers of the Kimberley region of Western Australia